Caleb F. Abbott (September 8, 1811 – April 24, 1855) was the mayor of Toledo, Ohio in 1850.

Life 

Mr. Abbott was born in Chelmsford, MA, he got a good education and became one of the well-learned residents of northwestern Ohio after finishing at Harvard College. Following in Henry Clay's footsteps, he became an important figure in the Whig party.

Through his university degree, he became a leading lawyer in the town of Toledo, in 1835-1836. His lawyer career brought him to become part of the first debating club in the Lucas County Prosecutor, then administered by Emery D. Potter. In 1838, he was co-founder of the first Public Library in Toledo. The same year he was elected, for the following four years, as the Lucas County Prosecutor.

His prominent role in Toledo had him become the Toledo mayor in 1850, replacing Daniel O. Morton in office. Abbott died in 1855 in this town and was buried at Forest Cemetery.

References 

1811 births
1855 deaths
Harvard College alumni
Mayors of Toledo, Ohio
Ohio Whigs
19th-century American politicians